Ebba Engdahl (born 29 October 1991) is a Swedish handballer who plays for Lugi HF and the Sweden national team.

Achievements 
Swedish Elitserien:
Bronze Medalist: 2016, 2017

References
 

1991 births
Living people
Sportspeople from Lund
Swedish female handball players 
Lugi HF players
21st-century Swedish women